Loyd Van Horne "Red" Durfee (December 23, 1895 – September 20, 1974) was an American soldier, professor, and baseball coach.  The son of General Lucius Loyd Durfee, Durfee attended the United States Military Academy, where he played baseball and hockey, and graduated in 1917.  He served in the United States Army in France during World War I.  Upon his return from the war, he was a Reserve Officer Training Corps instructor at Clemson College, and also served as the school's baseball coach from 1922 to 1924.  Durfee was later a Spanish language professor at West Point until 1948.

Coaching record

References

1895 births
1974 deaths
United States Military Academy alumni
Army Black Knights baseball players
Army Black Knights men's ice hockey players
United States Army personnel of World War I
Clemson Tigers baseball coaches
United States Military Academy faculty